The Tofaş  Murat 131, Şahin, Doğan, and Kartal are Turkish versions of the old Fiat 131 (older models)  automobile made in the Türk Otomobil Fabrikası A.Ş. factory in Bursa, Turkey. While doğan means "falcon" in Turkish, kartal means "eagle" and şahin means "hawk". The car was built from 1977 and sold in Turkey until 2002, with Egyptian assembly coming to an end in 2009 and in Ethiopia until 2010.

History

In February 1977 the Turkish Tofaş Murat 131 was first introduced, as a near exact replica of the Fiat 131. Originally it was only available with a Solex twin-barrel carbureted 1.3 L pushrod petrol four, producing  (SAE) at 5,250 rpm. From 1981 the Şahin ("Falcon") and Kartal names were also in use, with the Kartal ("Eagle") being the station wagon. From this point a 1.6-litre OHV engine was also added to the lineup, producing  DIN at 5,400 rpm. This largely replaced the smaller 1.3 (now with a claimed  DIN at 5,400 rpm with a Weber twin carburetor), which was only retained as a lower priced option for the more basic Şahin version. The single, rounded rectangular headlights of the earlier Murat 131s were replaced with double units. Announced in September 1981 (on sale by October), the new luxurious Doğan model received a five-speed manual transmission. The Doğan also received a fully fabric upholstered interior, a heated rear window, and had the front door vent windows removed. The luggage compartment was fully carpeted and the suspension was adjusted to minimize understeer at high speeds.

The five-speed remained standard only for the Doğan, although it later became an option in the lesser models. From 1984, the Doğan was also set apart by large rectangular headlights while the lesser Şahin and Kartal made do with round twin headlights.

Facelift
In 1988 they received a major aesthetic revision resulting in a design very reminiscent of the Fiat Regata. The "Murat" portion of the name was still used in some marketing material, but no longer appeared on the car and gradually vanished. The new headlights were large and square, with triangular corner lights which wrap around. The grille has a number of slim vertical crossbars in black plastic, with higher end models receiving some body colored elements at the top of the grille. After the facelift, the Doğan and Şahin sedan models are almost visually identical barring various upper-class trim options on the slightly more luxurious Doğan variant. The Kartal, the station wagon derivation of the design, has a rear body developed locally, with a higher roof than that of the 131 Estate originating with SEAT in Spain.

In August 1994 (for the 1995 model year), the range received a facelift with a new grille (body colored for all but the lowest specced versions), as well as new side view mirrors from the E30 3 Series. The grille had a prominent frame, with the opening containing a stylized "T" and a slim crossbar. The Doğan SLX also received power steering. The Şahin no longer received the 1.4 in Turkey after a while, instead being fitted with an  version of the 1.6. Later the grille received a circular central motif, containing the "T" logo.

In 1998, the "Kartal Kargo" was introduced. This was a two-seater panel van version of the wagon, akin to Fiat's own Marengo line. The Kartal Kargo can manage a  payload. The rear windows were plated and most trim details were in black plastic, but the Kargo did receive standard power steering.

In 2002 the range received another minor facelift, but this year also heralded the end of Turkish sales as they were now only produced for export, usually in CKD form. By this time the four-speed transmission was no longer available. In 2005 they were introduced with single point electronic fuel injection. Turkish production was gradually shifted to Egypt. In 2006 assembly was also commenced by DOCC in Ethiopia where it continued on a small scale until 2010 (see more below).

Tofaş Şahin, used as standard patrol car by General Directorate of Security, along with Renault 12 Toros in 1990s to mid-2000s. Kartal is used by Gendarmerie General Command. Both cars replaced by Fiat Doblo and Ford Transit Connect in 2000s.

Tofaş Şahin, Doğan and Kartal also exported to Azerbaijan, Georgia, Kazakhstan, Kyrgyzstan, Libya, Macedonia, Syria, Tunisia, Turkmenistan, Uzbekistan and as well as China. Right-hand drive models were produced for the Northern Cyprus market.

Decline

The Şahin, Doğan, and Kartal all shared the same rear wheel drive platform with longitudinal engine placement, MacPherson design suspension system for the front wheels and a live axle for the rear. Their major selling point was their low price, robust design, and its low-maintenance cost, largely due to its near universal popularity during the 1980s and 1990s. However, this design resulted in a very cramped passenger compartment as the gearbox, fuel tank and shaft tunnel occupied a lot of space. Due to its roots as a mid 1970s Italian passenger vehicle, the design lacked various safety equipment standards including ABS, passenger airbags, and traction control. Its popularity in Turkey started waning in the mid-1990s as modern imported cars flooded the market. More recently, most Tofas have been converted to use LPG fuel as gasoline prices soared and made the cars financially unfeasible in its unmodified state. It was the de facto taxi of Turkey before it was deemed unsuitable for taxi use due to Turkey's ongoing negotiations to enter the EU, and the ensuing regulations implemented. The models have been replaced by the Fiat Siena (later the Fiat Albea/Fiat Palio) series.

Nasr variant
Türk Otomobil Fabrikası A.Ş. produced the Şahin and its siblings under license in Egypt in large quantities from 1991, with assembly carried out by the state-owned Nasr car company. The range underwent the same changes as did Turkish market models, although the Kartal was taken out of production in 2003 and the Doğan was eventually replaced by the Şahin 1600 SL - with the 1400 S beneath it in the lineup. Production was gradually shifted to Egypt, with local parts content reaching 45% by 2006. With the winding down of the Nasr company in 2009, Egyptian production ended.

DOCC
In 2006 the Tofaş Şahin was put into production in Addis Ababa, Ethiopia, by the Holland Car Company, a joint venture between a firm from the Netherlands called Trento Engineering and the local firm of Ethio-Holland. Their version of the Şahin is called the DOCC, which comes from the term Dutch Overseas Car Company and comes with the OHC 1.6 L (1,581 cc) powerplant. After the end at El Nasr, Ethiopian production came to a halt in 2010.

References

External links
 Şahin Info, Pix, Specs, History,.... by HRH_Sameh
 Modified Şahin by HRH_Sameh
 HC Holland Car Docc
 Arabalar

Cars of Egypt
Cars of Turkey
Mid-size cars
Sedans
Rear-wheel-drive vehicles
Police vehicles
Taxi vehicles
1980s cars
1990s cars
2000s cars

de:Tofaş Şahin